John S. Gray (1851 – March 11, 1902) was a Republican politician from Idaho. He served as the second lieutenant governor of Idaho.  As President Pro-Tempore, Gray filled in as lieutenant governor upon N. B. Willey's resignation in 1890. He died in 1902.

References
 

Idaho Republicans
Lieutenant Governors of Idaho
1851 births
1902 deaths